Trinity Presbyterian School is a Christian day school serving grades K3-12th located in Montgomery, Alabama. It was founded in 1970

History
The school was founded by Trinity Presbyterian Church, an all-white church that resisted efforts for blacks to join the congregation.

Trinity School opened in a local church in 1970 with 200 students and 15 instructors, as Montgomery county public schools were being racially integrated. Some historians have described the school as a segregation academy. As of 1986, only two of the schools 645 students were black.

References

External links
Trinity Presbyterian School homepage

Educational institutions established in 1970
Schools in Montgomery, Alabama
Presbyterian schools in the United States
Schools accredited by the Southern Association of Colleges and Schools
Private high schools in Alabama
Private middle schools in Alabama
Private elementary schools in Alabama
Segregation academies in Alabama
Christian schools in Alabama